Munir Bhatti  is a retired field hockey player who was a member of the Pakistan National Hockey Team from 1978-1979. He was born in Sialkot. A half back, he was capped by Pakistan 13 times, scoring no goals.

References
Pakistan International Hockey Players

Pakistani male field hockey players
Field hockey players from Sialkot
Living people
Asian Games gold medalists for Pakistan
Medalists at the 1978 Asian Games
Asian Games medalists in field hockey
Field hockey players at the 1978 Asian Games
Year of birth missing (living people)
20th-century Pakistani people